The Department of Resources is a department of the Queensland Government in Australia. The department is responsible for regulating mining, and resources in the state.

The department's headquarters are at 1 William Street, Brisbane.

Structure
The department is the responsibility of the Minister for Resources Scott Stewart. The department works across three key areas: 
 Land and property
 Mining and resources
 Mapping and data

These responsibilities include place naming in Queensland. The department also operates the Museum of Lands, Mapping and Surveying.

See also

Government of Queensland
Geological Survey of Queensland

References

External links
Official site

Natural Resources, Mines and Energy
Mining in Queensland
Subnational mining ministries